Romney may refer to:

Romney (surname), including a list of people with the name
Romney family, a family prominent in U.S. politics
George W. Romney (1907–1995), former CEO of American Motors, Governor of Michigan, and U.S. Secretary of Housing and Urban Development
Mitt Romney (born 1947), Republican politician, U.S. Senator for Utah, and former Governor of Massachusetts, and businessman

Places

Canada
Romney Township, Ontario, a township in Kent County, Ontario

United Kingdom
Romney Deanery, a Deanery of the Canterbury Diocese, in Kent, England
Romney Island, an island in the English River Thames
Romney Marsh, a wetland in Kent and East Sussex, England
Romney Road, a road in England near the River Thames
New Romney, a town in Kent

United States
Romney, Indiana, an unincorporated community
Romney, Pennsylvania, an unincorporated community
Romney, Texas, an unincorporated community
Romney, West Virginia, (population, 1,940), the oldest town in West Virginia

Buildings and structures
Romney's House, a Grade I listed house in Hampstead, London, built by the artist George Romney
Romney hut, a type of British pre-fabricated building
George W. Romney Building or the Romney Building, the Governor of Michigan's main office location
Romney African-American Cemetery, an old cemetery in Romney, West Virginia
Romney Lock, a lock on the English River Thames
Romney Stadium, an outdoor football stadium at Utah State University

Companies and organizations
Romney's, an English baking company, founded 1918
Romney, Hythe and Dymchurch Railway, a heritage railway in Kent, England
Romney Academy, a 19th-century educational institution in Romney, West Virginia
Romney Middle School, a school in Romney, West Virginia
Sir William Romney's School, Tetbury, a secondary school

Military
Romney Expedition, an early maneuver of the Confederate Army in the US Civil War

Naval warships
HMS Romney, a British Royal Navy ship name
HMS Romney (1694), a 50-gun English naval warship
HMS Romney (1708), a 50-gun English naval warship
HMS Romney (1762), a 50-gun English naval warship

Other uses
Romney (sheep), a breed of sheep bred for meat
Earl of Romney, an English title
Romney Formation, a stratum of sedimentary rock

See also
Massachusetts health care reform, a 2006 health-care reform bill in Massachusetts commonly known as Romneycare
New Romney, Kent, England
New Romney (UK Parliament constituency), the Parliament seat for New Romney
New Romney railway station, a depot in Kent, England
Old Romney, a nearby Kentish village of similar age to New Romney
Romney Sands railway station, a depot in Kent, England
Romny, a city in the Ukraine
Shuzenji Romney Railway, a railway on the Izu Peninsula of Japan